David Hampton (April 28, 1964 – July 18, 2003) was an American con artist and robber who became infamous in the 1980s after he convinced a group of wealthy Manhattanites to give him money, food, and shelter under the pretense that he was the son of Sidney Poitier. Hampton's story became the inspiration for a play and a film. He died of AIDS-related complications in 2003.

Background
Hampton was born in Buffalo, New York, and was the eldest son of an attorney. He moved to New York City (NYC) in 1981 and stumbled upon his now-famous ruse in 1983, when he and another man were attempting to gain entry into Studio 54. After the club denied Hampton and his partner entry, Hampton's partner decided to pose as Gregory Peck's son while Hampton assumed the identity of Sidney Poitier's son. They were ushered in as celebrities. Thereafter, Hampton adopted the persona of "David Poitier" to obtain free meals in restaurants. He also persuaded at least a dozen people into letting him stay with them and give him money, including Melanie Griffith, Gary Sinise, Calvin Klein, John Jay Iselin, the president of WNET; Osborn Elliott, the dean of the Columbia University Graduate School of Journalism; Leonard Bernstein, and a Manhattan urologist. He convinced some that he was an acquaintance of their children, some that he had just missed a plane to Los Angeles with his luggage still on it, and some that his belongings had been stolen.

In October 1983, Hampton was arrested and convicted of fraud and ordered to pay restitution of $4,469 to his various victims. After refusing to comply with these terms, he was sentenced to a term of 18 months to 4 years in prison.

Six Degrees of Separation
Playwright John Guare became interested in Hampton's story through his friendship with Inger McCabe Elliott and Osborn Elliott, who had been outraged to find "David Poitier" in bed with another man the morning after they let him into their home. Six Degrees of Separation opened at the Lincoln Center in May 1990 and became a long-running success.

Hampton attempted to parlay the play's success to his benefit, giving interviews to the press, gate-crashing a producer's party, and beginning a campaign of harassment against Guare that included phone calls and death threats. The harassment campaign prompted Guare to apply for a restraining order in April 1991. The restraining order was denied. In the fall of 1991, Hampton filed a $100 million lawsuit, claiming that the play had infringed on the copyright on his persona and his story. The lawsuit was eventually dismissed.

Death
David Hampton died of AIDS-related complications while being treated for his illness at Beth Israel Medical Center (BIMC) in Manhattan.

See also
Alan Conway, a con-artist with a similar modus operandi

References

External links
 Suspect in Hoax is Arrested Here in Rendezvous at nytimes.com (October 19, 1983)
 Teen-Ager Who Posed As Poitier 'Son' Guilty at nytimes.com (November 20, 1983)
 Impersonator Wants To Portray Still Others, This Time, Onstage at nytimes.com (July 31, 1990)
 HEADLINERS; Playing Himself at nytimes.com (August 5, 1990)
 About New York; He Conned the Society Crowd but Died Alone at nytimes.com (July 19, 2003)

1964 births
2003 deaths
20th-century American criminals
AIDS-related deaths in New York (state)
Criminals from New York (state)
Impostors
LGBT people from New York (state)
People from Buffalo, New York
Prisoners and detainees of New York (state)
American confidence tricksters
LGBT African Americans
20th-century American LGBT people
21st-century American LGBT people